Gerkez is a village in the Balkan Region of Turkmenistan along both sides of Sumbar, about 20 km west of Magtymguly. It is held to be the birthplace of Magtymguly Pyragy.

Features 
The most prominent attraction is the three-roomed Magtymguly Museum. 

At the eastern edge of the village, there is a bridge over Sumbar, constructed of metallic pipes. Crossing across leads to the Sheikh Ovezberdy Mausoleum, just beyond the last house of Gerkez. Dated to 15th century, its fired-brick structure —square base of about 9m. length, with a dome— stands amidst a meadow.

Notes

References 

Populated places in Balkan Region
Balkan Region